Booba is a 2001 Philippine comedy film co-written, co-edited and directed by Joyce Bernal. The film stars Rufa Mae Quinto as the title role.

Cast
 Rufa Mae Quinto as Booba
 Gary Estrada as Poli
 Ai-Ai delas Alas as Gretchen
 Gina Pareño as Lola Belle
 Roldan Aquino as Gen. Lee
 Archie Ventosa as Gen. Dionisio
 Denver Razon as Luis
 Ava Avila as Ranza
 Rico Miguel as Bimbo
 Rad Dominguez as Jimbo
 Polly Cadsawan as Head of Syndicate
 Felindo Obach as Miguel V
 Rudy Meyer as Mang Pepe
 Josie Galvez as Wife of Mang Pepe
 George Lim as Ponga
 Angie Reyes as Junior
 Peter Lim as Eng Be Ten

References

External links

2001 films
2001 comedy films
Filipino-language films
Philippine comedy films
Viva Films films
Films directed by Joyce Bernal